Shaykhism is a Shi'a Islamic school founded by Shaykh Ahmad in early 19th-century Qajar Iran. While grounded in traditional Twelver Shiʻi doctrine, Shaykhism diverged from the Usuli school in its interpretation of key ideas such as the nature of the end times and the day of resurrection, the source of jurisprudential authority, and the proper hermeneutic to be employed in interpreting prophecy through the mystical writings of the Twelver Imams. These divergences resulted in controversy and ongoing accusations of heresy from Usulis and Akhbaris.

It has been described as a mystical strand of Twelver Shi'a Islam.

, there remained a following in Iran, Iraq Saudi Arabia, Kuwait and Pakistan.

Shaykhí teachings

Eschatology
The primary force behind Ahmad's teachings is the belief in the occultation of the Twelfth Imam. Believers in this doctrine, hold that the last divine ordained leader, or Imam, lives in occultation and will reappear as the promised Mahdi. Following the Mahdi's appearance, Ahmad teaches that the Imam Hussain ibn Ali will return to re-conquer the world and that the Imam Ali and prophet Muhammad will kill Satan. Al Raj'a (meaning "the return" in English) was heavily emphasized by Ahmad and is more important in Shaykhism than in the Usuli school of Islam.

Shaykh Ahmad's perspectives on accepted Islamic doctrines diverged in several areas, most notably on his mystical interpretation of prophesy.  The sun, moon and stars of the Qurʼan's eschatological surahs are seen as allegorical, similar to Ismailis, where common Muslim interpretation is that events involving celestial bodies will happen literally at the Day of Judgment.

Mystical interpretation
In other writings, Shaykh Ahmad synthesizes rather dramatic descriptions of the origin of the prophets, the primal word, and other religious themes through allusions and mystical language.  Much of this language is oriented around trees, specifically the primal universal tree of Eden, described in Jewish scripture as being two trees. This primal tree is, in some ways, the universal spirit of the prophets themselves:The symbol of the preexistent tree appears elsewhere in Shaykh Ahmad's writings. He says, for instance, that the Prophet and the Imams exist both on the level of unconstrained being or preexistence, wherein they are the Complete Word and the Most Perfect Man, and on the level of constrained being. On this second, limited plane, the cloud of the divine Will subsists and from it emanates the Primal Water that irrigates the barren earth of matter and of elements. Although the divine Will remains unconstrained in essential being, its manifest aspect has now entered into limited being. When God poured down from the clouds of Will on the barren earth, he thereby sent down this water and it mixed with the fallow soil. In the garden of the heaven known as as-Saqurah, the Tree of Eternity arose, and the Holy Spirit or Universal Intellect, the first branch that grew upon it, is the first creation among the worlds.

Prominent Scholars

Shaykh Ahmad

Shaykh Ahmad, at about age forty, began to study in earnest in the Shiʻa centres of religious scholarship such as Karbala and Najaf.  He attained sufficient recognition in such circles to be declared a mujtahid, an interpreter of Islamic Law.  He contended with Sufi and Neo-Platonist scholars, and attained a positive reputation among their detractors.  He declared that all knowledge and sciences were contained (in essential form) within the Qurʼan, and that to excel in the sciences, all knowledge must be gleaned from the Qurʼan. His leadership style and approach to interpretation draw both on traditional and theosophical methods, attempting to harmonize these two streams of Shiʻia thought in unprecedented ways, and emphasizing the validity of intuitive knowledge for religious thought. Rather than relying entirely on Ijtihad, or independent rational justification, Shakyh Ahmad claimed to derive direct guidance from the Imams. Relying entirely on individual justification for religious guidance had, he suggested, led to the introduction into Shiʻa belief of erroneous views of particular scholars. By emphasizing the role of a charismatic leader whose work was suggested to share in the infallibility of the Imams, Shakyh Ahmad suggested that the diversity of rulings promoted by the ulama could be replaced with a singular set of doctrines-this view would later find widespread support in the Ayatollah system of modern Usulism. His views resulted in his denunciation by several learned clerics, and he engaged in many debates before moving on to Persia where he settled for a time in the province of Yazd. It was in Isfahan that most of this was written.

Sayyid Kazim Rashti

Al-Ahsa'is most prominent student, Kazim Rashti, was given the authority to teach on his behalf in Karbala and became his undisputed successor.

Abbas Amanat notes that, in contrast to other religious schools in Iran where students came from families of high-ranking clerics, "the majority of the students in Rashti's circle, with the exception of a few, were alike in their humble origins".

Karim Khan
Al-Rashti had hundreds of students and several of his leading students claimed to be the true successors to his scholarship. The two main currents of Shaykhism since then came to be known as the Kermani and Tabrizi Schools.

Karim Khan Kermani (1809/1810-1870/1871) became the leader of the main Shaykhi group. He became the foremost critic of those that formed a new religion, writing four essays against them. He repudiated some of the more radical teachings of Ahsai and Rashti and moved the Shaykhi school back towards the mainstream Usuli teachings. Karim Khan Kirmani was succeeded by his son Shaykh Muhammad Khan Kirmani (1846–1906), then by Muhammad's brother Shaykh Zaynal 'Abidln Kirmani (1859–1946). Shaykh Zayn al-'Abidin Kirmani was succeeded by Shaykh Abu al-Qasim Ibrahimi (1896–1969), who was succeeded by his son 'Abd al-Rida Khan Ibrahimi who was a leader until his death.

Muhammad Baqir Sharif Tabatabae
Mirza Muhammad Baqir Sharif Tabatabaei was born in a village named Qehi, in the vicinity of Isfahan, in 1823. His father, Mulla Muhammad Jafar was an admirer of Sheikh Ahmad Ahsaei.

After learning the basics from his father, Mirza Muhammad Baqir travelled to Isfahan to continue his education, and resided in Nimavard School where he studied different sciences for several years. Then he met one of the admirers of Haj Muhammad Karim Kermani, (who was also known as “Badr”). Since Kermani was on a pilgrimage to Imam Reza's shrine in Mashhad through Yazd, he travelled to Yazd in the hope of visiting the great man in 1261 Hijri year.

Since the path was dangerous, and Kermani had to return to Kerman, Mirza Muhammad Baqir accompanied him to Kerman, and resided in Ibrahimieh School, studying Islamic theology. He soon reached a level where he could teach the lessons of his grand master.

After several years, the date of which is not known, Kermani sent him to the city of Naein for preaching and guidance, where he spent some years preaching and proselytizing.
Mirza Muhammad Baqir immediately gained the attention and respect of the Sheikhieh members of Naein, Anarak, Jandaq, Biabanak and the surrounding cities.

Then he returned to Kerman, Until Kermani left for a pilgrimage to Karbala in 1283 Hijri year. When Kermani arrived in Hamedan, because of the great number of Sheikhieh adherents, and also lack of great leaders after the demise of Mullah Abdulsamad Hamedani, he appointed Mirza Muhammad Baqir as a leader in his absence, and continued his pilgrimage to Karbala.

Mirza Muhammad Baqir stayed in Hamedan since his mentor had mandated it. He engaged in preaching, proselytizing and teaching Islamic principles for 32 years. He was a great leader and protector for the Sheikhieh members after the demise of his mentor, until 1315 Hijri.

In Eid al-Fitr of 1315, when the riots of Hamedan occurred, he migrated to Jandaq village and stayed there for the rest of his fruitful life, teaching Islamic principles and preaching.

Mirza Muhammad Baqir died on the 23rd of Shaʼban 1319 (1901), at the age of 80. After Maqrib and Isha prayer.

This great man was buried in the same village, but after two years, his body was moved to Mashhad, to be laid to rest in Imam Reza's shrine, next to his Imam. He has left more than 190 manuscripts and almost 2000 sermons and teachings.

Modern Shaykhism
The current leader of the Shaykhiya is Zein al-Abedin Ebrahimi from Iran which become the leader of Shaykhiya when the last leader Mr. Ali al-Musawi died in Iraq.

Ali al-Musawi was the man who heads a community with followers in Iraq - mainly Basrah and Karbala - Iran and the Persian Gulf. Basrah has a significant Shaykhi minority, and their mosque is one of the largest in the city holding up to 12,000 people. The Shaykhiya were resolutely apolitical and hence were allowed relative freedom under Saddam Hussein. Since the 2003 Invasion of Iraq and subsequent Iraqi Civil War they have been targeted by Iraqi nationalists who accused them of being Saudis on the grounds that Ahmad al-Ahsai was from present-day Saudi Arabia. They responded by creating an armed militia and asking all local political groups to sign a pact allowing them to live in peace. This was done at the al-Zahra conference in April 2006. In a move away from their traditional apolitical stance, a Shaykhi political party stood in the Basra governorate election, 2009; they came third, winning 5% of the votes and 2 out of 35 seats.

Reception in other religions

Bábís and then Baháʼís see Shaykhism as a spiritual ancestor of their movement, preparing the way for the Báb and eventually Baháʼu'lláh. According to this view, Shaykhism has outlived its eschatological purpose and is no longer relevant. There are many connections between Bábism and Shaykhism. The Báb met with Siyyid Kazim several times and more than half of the 'prominent' converts to the Bábí Faith in its first four years were Shaykhis according to Moojan Momen and Peter Smith. One key similarity between Shaykhism and the Bábí and Baháʼí Faiths is their shared emphasis on a symbolic and allegorical understanding of religious scripture.

Further reading
 Corbin, Henry (1977). Spriritual Body and Celestial Earth: From Mazdean Iran to Shi'ite Iran. Princeton University Press, New Jersey.
 Related documents on Bahai-library.com

Notes

References

External links
Early Shaykhism: Some Bibliographical Notes, Translations and Studies by Stephen Lambden
Collected Works of Shaykh Ahmad al-Ahsa'i at H-Bahai Discussion Network
Al-Abrar; Digital Library of Shaykhia

 Shaykhism
Twelver Shi'ism
Ja'fari jurisprudence
History of the Bahá'í Faith
Shia Islam in Iraq
Islam in Iran